Graigwen was the name of two steamships operated by I Williams & Co, Cardiff.

, torpedoed and sunk in 1940
, in service 1946–58

Ship names